Kristián Bari (born 6 February 2001) is a Slovak professional footballer who currently plays for Fortuna Liga club MŠK Žilina as a left-back.

Club career
He is a son of former known Slovak forward Eugen Bari.

MŠK Žilina
Bari made his Fortuna Liga debut for Žilina during a home fixture against FC Spartak Trnava on 14 May 2022.

References

External links
 MŠK Žilina official club profile 
 
 Futbalnet profile 
 

2001 births
Living people
People from Fiľakovo
Sportspeople from the Banská Bystrica Region
Slovak footballers
Slovakia youth international footballers
Association football defenders
FC ŠTK 1914 Šamorín players
FC DAC 1904 Dunajská Streda players
MŠK Žilina players
2. Liga (Slovakia) players
Slovak Super Liga players